Alejandro Domingo Gómez (born 22 November 2001), commonly known as Neskes or Neeskens, is a Spanish professional footballer who plays as an attacking midfielder for FC Cartagena B.

Club career
Born in Granada, Andalusia, Neskes joined Granada CF's youth setup in 2015, from UD Maracena. On 7 September 2020, after finishing his formation, he signed for FC Cartagena and was assigned to the reserves in Tercera División.

Neskes made his senior debut on 18 October 2020, starting in a 2–0 home win against Racing Murcia FC. He scored his first senior goal on 20 December, netting his team's fifth in a 7–0 home routing of Lorca FC.

Neskes made his first team debut on 16 August 2021, coming on as a second-half substitute for Richard Boateng in a 1–3 home loss against UD Almería. On 8 September, he renewed his contract until 2024.

Personal life
Neskes' brother José Francisco is also a footballer and a midfielder, who was also groomed at Granada. Their father José Domingo also played as a senior for the club, but never appeared professionally.

References

External links

2001 births
Living people
Footballers from Granada
Spanish footballers
Association football midfielders
Segunda División players
Tercera División players
Tercera Federación players
FC Cartagena B players
FC Cartagena footballers